Otto Mayregger (born 3 September 1962) is an Austrian luger. He competed in the men's singles event at the 1988 Winter Olympics.

References

External links
 

1962 births
Living people
Austrian male lugers
Olympic lugers of Austria
Lugers at the 1988 Winter Olympics
Sportspeople from Innsbruck